Rey Dorta (born Reinaldo J. Dorta, Jr. on October 28, 1969, in Miami Beach, Florida) is an American attorney based in Coral Gables, Florida.

Education
Dorta was born to Cuban parents who immigrated to the United States in 1968.  He was raised in the lower to middle-class neighborhood of Allapattah and attended Corpus Christi Grammar School, graduating in 1983.  He briefly attended Immaculate La Salle in 1984 and went to Archbishop Curley-Notre Dame High School, graduating in 1987.

In 1992 he obtained a Bachelor of Science, followed by a Master of Science from Florida International University.  After obtaining his Juris Doctor from the University of Akron, in 1996 he became a prosecutor for the Miami-Dade County State Attorney's Office, gaining ample trial experience. He further gained invaluable experience working for a plaintiff's personal injury firm as well as being staff counsel for Chartis, formerly AIG Insurance.

Career
Dorta is a shareholder and one of the founding partners (the other is Omar Ortega) of Dorta & Ortega, P.A., a Coral Gables firm concentrating on Criminal Defense, Commercial Litigation, Personal Injury, Workers' Compensation, Real Estate, Overtime Claims and Defenses, and International Arbitration. He is an AV Preeminent rated lawyer scoring a 5.0 out of 5.0 which is a significant rating accomplishment - a testament to the fact that a lawyer's peers rank him at the highest level of professional excellence.

Dorta has appeared on a variety of Spanish language television shows:  Maria Elvira Confronta, Arrebatados, A la Siete con Fernando, as well as a guest commentator and contributor for GEN TV and Notcias 22.

References

External links
www.dortaandortega.com

1969 births
Living people
American lawyers
American people of Cuban descent
Florida International University alumni
University of Akron alumni
People from Coral Gables, Florida